The National Library José Martí (Spanish: Biblioteca Nacional José Martí) is the national library in Cuba. It is located in La Habana and named after the national hero José Martí. This library was established on October 18, 1901. BNJM is a partner in the Digital Library of the Caribbean, contributing digitized materials to share with the world as Open Access. Information about the extensive holdings are available through WorldCat.

See also 
 List of national libraries
 List of libraries in Cuba

References

External links 
 Biblioteca Nacional José Martí
 Materials from the collections of the National Library José Martí available as Open Access in the Digital Library of the Caribbean
 Materials from the collective work by the National Library José Martí and other partners in the Celebrating Cuba initiative available as Open Access in the Digital Library of the Caribbean

 
Jose Marti
1901 establishments in Cuba
Libraries established in 1901
Buildings and structures in Havana
20th-century architecture in Cuba